The 2012 Davis Cup World Group Play-offs were held from September 14 to 16. They were the main play-offs of the 2012 Davis Cup. Winners of the playoffs advanced to the 2013 World Group, and losers were relegated to their respective Zonal Regions I.

Teams
Bold indicates team has qualified for the 2013 Davis Cup World Group.

 From World Group

 From Americas Group I

 From Asia/Oceania Group I

 From Europe/Africa Group I

Results

Seeded teams
 
 
 
 
 
 
 
 

Unseeded teams

 
 
 
 
  
 
 
 

Playoff results

Kazakhstan vs. Uzbekistan

Germany vs. Australia

Japan vs. Israel

Belgium vs. Sweden

Canada vs South Africa

Brazil vs. Russia

Italy vs. Chile

Netherlands vs. Switzerland

References

World Group Play-offs